Faton Peci (born 16 June 1982) is a Kosovar Albanian politician and current minister of agriculture, forestry and rural development of the Republic of Kosovo. He is one the leaders of the Guxo party.

References

Living people
1982 births
Government ministers of Kosovo
Agriculture ministers